John Oliver (born 1977) is an English comedian known for his work on The Daily Show and Last Week Tonight.

John Oliver may also refer to:

Arts
John Oliver (composer) (born 1959), Canadian composer
John Oliver (conductor), American conductor and founder of the Tanglewood Festival Chorus
John Oliver, also known as Gerry Bean (20th century), Canadian actor

Religion
John Oliver (Archdeacon of Ardagh) (died 1778)
John Oliver (Archdeacon of Leeds) (1939–2021)
John Oliver (bishop) (born 1935), former Bishop of Hereford
John Oliver (Dean of Christ Church) (died 1552), Anglican priest
John Oliver (Dean of Worcester) (1601–1661), Anglican priest

Sports
John Oliver (canoeist) (born 1943), British sprint canoer
John Oliver (cricketer) (1918–1992), English cricketer
John Oliver (footballer, born 1867) (1867–?), English footballer who played in the 1880s, and 1890s
John Oliver (footballer, born 1913) (1913–1991), English footballer of the 1930s
John Oliver (speedway rider) (born 1987), Australian speedway rider
John Henry Oliver, American baseball player

Politics 

John Oliver (British Columbia politician) (1856–1927), Canadian politician and former Premier of British Columbia
John Oliver (Ontario politician) (born 1956), Canadian politician

Others
Jack Oliver (scientist) (John Ertle Oliver, 1923–2011), American scientist
John Dudley Oliver (1834–1909), British Army general and Commandant of the Royal Military College, Canada
John Morrison Oliver (1828–1872), American general in the U.S. Civil War
John Rathbone Oliver (1872–1943), American psychiatrist, medical historian, author, and priest
John Watkins Oliver (1914–1990), American federal judge
"Jonny Oliver", a character performed by Munya Chawawa

See also
Jon Oliva (born 1959), lead vocalist for Savatage
Jack Oliver (disambiguation)
John Olver (disambiguation)